Linda Diane Thompson (born 1950) is an American songwriter, former actress and beauty pageant winner.

Thompson began her acting career as a "Hee Haw Honey" on the American television variety show Hee Haw. She was also a girlfriend of Elvis Presley, before marrying Olympic decathlon champion Caitlyn Jenner, and then music producer David Foster.

Early life
Thompson was born in 1950 and raised in Memphis, Tennessee, the daughter of Margie (née White) and Sanford Abel Thompson. Her older brother, Sam, was one of Elvis Presley's bodyguards.

Career

Pageants
Thompson was Miss Shelby County (1969) In September 1970, she was named "Miss Mid-South Fair" in Memphis.

In 1970, Thompson was named "Miss Memphis State University" and was third runner-up in the 1970 Miss Tennessee pageant (which is the state preliminary to the Miss America pageant).

Thompson was Miss Tennessee Universe in 1972, which is also known as Miss Tennessee USA and under the Miss USA and Miss Universe umbrella:

Jeanne LeMay Dumas, Thompson's best friend, recounts this first meeting with Elvis in an interview for her book, Elvis, Linda and Me" and later became Elvis' personal secretary. Dumas said:

Acting
In 1977, Thompson became a regular on the television series Hee Haw. She later had small one-episode roles in such television series as CHiPs, Starsky & Hutch, Vega$, Fantasy Island, The Fall Guy and Beverly Hills, 90210.

Thompson starred in several television pilots, including "Mars Base One" and "Two for Two". She appeared in several films, including Three on a Meathook (1972), Rabbit Test (1978) and Original Intent (1991). She had a small role in The Bodyguard (1992).

She appeared as Linda Jenner in a workout video by then-spouse Caitlyn Jenner, four documentaries about Elvis Presley between 1997 and 2004, and in the short-lived Princes of Malibu, a reality series about then-husband David Foster's efforts to improve her two sons and herself.

Songwriting
She began her career as a lyricist with the Kenny Rogers single "Our Perfect Song" from his album The Heart of the Matter (1985). Thompson collaborated with composer Richard Marx on Josh Groban's first hit record, "To Where You Are", with composer Steve Dorff on the Celine Dion hit "Miracle", with Andreas Carlsson for "Drowning" by the Backstreet Boys, and composer David Foster on several compositions, including "No Explanation" for the film Pretty Woman (1990), and "I Have Nothing" for the film The Bodyguard (1992), for which they were nominated both for the Academy Award for Best Song in 1993 and the Grammy Award for Best Song Written Specifically for a Motion Picture or for Television in 1994, and "Grown-Up Christmas List".

In 1999, Linda Thompson, Clint Eastwood and Carole Bayer Sager wrote "Why Should I Care" for the film True Crime. In 2001, she wrote "Drowning" for the American boyband Backstreet Boys. In 2011, Thompson, Foster and Jackie Evancho collaborated on the title track for Evancho's album Dream With Me.

Thompson and Foster received the 2003 Emmy Award for Outstanding Music and Lyrics for "Aren't They All Our Children" for "The Concert for World Children's Day", which aired November 14, 2002.

Author
In 2016, HarperCollins imprint Dey Street Books published Thompson's memoir, A Little Thing Called Life, which featured on The New York Times Best Seller list.

Personal life

Life with Elvis
On July 6, 1972, Thompson attended a private movie screening hosted by Elvis Presley at the Memphian Theater in Memphis. Thompson was 22 at the time. She and Presley subsequently dated for four years before breaking up around Christmas 1976. They broke up because, like Priscilla before her, Thompson wanted a "normal" life,  which was not possible with Presley's lifestyle. However, they broke up on good terms and remained good friends until Presley's death.

Marriage to Caitlyn Jenner
In 1980, Thompson began a relationship with Olympic gold medal decathlete Caitlyn Jenner prior to Jenner's transition. The couple married on January 5, 1981, in Oahu, Hawaii. They have two sons together, Brandon and Sam Brody, known as Brody. The couple separated in 1986 after Jenner came out to Thompson as a trans woman, and they eventually divorced after going through counseling.

Marriage to David Foster
On June 22, 1991, Thompson married Canadian composer and record producer David Foster; they divorced in 2005.

Honors and awards
Thompson won a BMI Film & TV Award in 1994 for Most Performed Song from a Film ("I Have Nothing"), composed by Thompson and David Foster for the soundtrack for The Bodyguard. She shared Special Recognition Awards in 1997 and 2004 with several others for work related to the Olympics, including lyrics for the official 1996 Olympic theme song, "The Power of the Dream", sung by Celine Dion.

Notes

References

Living people
1950 births
Actresses from Tennessee
American film actresses
American television actresses
Emmy Award winners
Jenner family
Miss Tennessee USA winners
Miss USA 1970s delegates
Songwriters from Tennessee
University of Memphis alumni
Writers from Memphis, Tennessee
20th-century American people